Events from the year 1751 in Wales.

Incumbents
Lord Lieutenant of North Wales (Lord Lieutenant of Anglesey, Caernarvonshire, Flintshire, Merionethshire, Montgomeryshire) – George Cholmondeley, 3rd Earl of Cholmondeley 
Lord Lieutenant of Glamorgan – Charles Powlett, 3rd Duke of Bolton
Lord Lieutenant of Brecknockshire and Lord Lieutenant of Monmouthshire – Thomas Morgan
Lord Lieutenant of Cardiganshire – Wilmot Vaughan, 3rd Viscount Lisburne
Lord Lieutenant of Carmarthenshire – vacant until 1755
Lord Lieutenant of Denbighshire – Richard Myddelton
Lord Lieutenant of Pembrokeshire – Sir Arthur Owen, 3rd Baronet
Lord Lieutenant of Radnorshire – William Perry

Bishop of Bangor – Zachary Pearce
Bishop of Llandaff – Edward Cresset
Bishop of St Asaph – Robert Hay Drummond
Bishop of St Davids – The Hon. Richard Trevor (until 7 December)

Events
20 April - George, eldest son of Frederick, Prince of Wales, succeeds his father as Prince of Wales.
September - Richard Morris co-founds the Honourable Society of Cymmrodorion in London.
Richard Price Thelwall inherits his brother's Caernarfonshire estate.

Arts and literature

New books
William Williams (Pantycelyn) - Hosanna i Fab Dafydd, part 1

Music
William Williams (Pantycelyn) - Hosanna i Fab Dafydd, part 1

Births
22 January - David Richards (Dafydd Ionawr), poet (died 1827)
15 October - David Samwell (Dafydd Ddu Feddyg), naval surgeon, companion of Captain Cook and bard (died 1798)

Deaths
31 March - Frederick, Prince of Wales, 44 (pulmonary embolism)
20 September - Anne Vaughan, Duchess of Bolton, 61/62
2 October - Thomas Mathews, admiral, 75
19 December - Princess Louise of Wales, queen of Denmark and Norway, 27

References

1751 by country
1751 in Great Britain